The 2013 IFMAR 1:10 Electric Off-Road World Championships was the fifteenth edition of the IFMAR - 1:10 Electric Off-Road World Championship was held in America. The track is located at Silver Dollar Fairgrounds and is on a large purpose built 150’×110’ dirt track.

Schedule

2WD - Class
Sunday 22nd Sept: Registration, Opening Ceremony
Monday 23rd Sept: Practice
Tuesday 24th Sept: Practice, 4 Qualifying Rounds
Wednesday 25th Sept: Q5, Finals

4WD - Class
Thursday 26th Sept: Registration
Friday 27th Sept: Practice
Saturday 28th Sept: Practice, 4 Qualifying Rounds
Sunday 29th Sept: Q5, Finals

Results

2WD

4WD

References

Sources
 Neo Buggies Online Blog Coverage
 Red RC Online Blog Coverage

External links
 Official Event Website 
 Official Videos RedRC Live

IFMAR 1:10 Electric Off-Road World Championship